The Porsche 911 GT3 is a high-performance homologation model of the Porsche 911 sports car. It is a line of high-performance models, which began with the 1973 911 Carrera RS.
The GT3 has had a successful racing career in the one-make national and regional Porsche Carrera Cup and GT3 Cup Challenge series, as well as the international Porsche Supercup supporting the FIA Formula 1 World Championship.

Road cars

996 GT3

996.1 GT3 
The "GT3" nameplate was introduced in 1999 as part of the first generation of the Porsche 996 model range (commonly known as 996.1) as a homologation model for the cars entered in the FIA GT3 cup. As with Porsche's previous 911 RS models, the 996 GT3 was focused on racing, and so was devoid of items that added unnecessary weight to the car. Sound deadening was almost completely removed, as were the rear seats, rear loud speakers, sunroof, and air conditioning, although automatic air conditioning and CD/radio became no-cost optional add-ons.

The engine of the 996 GT3 set it apart from most of the other 996 models, although it shared the same basic design of the standard so-called "integrated dry sump" flat-six engine. The engine is naturally aspirated and based on the unit used in the 962 and 911 GT1 race cars. That engine was known as the 'Mezger' engine, after its designer Hans Mezger. The engine uses the original air-cooled 911's versatile dry-sump crankcase, with an external oil reservoir. In GT3 configuration, this so-called "split" crankcase (meaning the parting line of crankcase is on the crankshaft centreline) uses, instead of a fan and finned cylinders, separate water jackets added onto each side of the crankcase to cool banks of three cylinders with water pumped through a radiator. Thus, the GT3 engine is very similar to the completely water-cooled 962 racing car's engine, which is based on the same crankcase. The 962 differs, however, by using six individual cylinder heads while the GT1/GT3, like the air and water-cooled 959, uses two cylinder heads, each covering a bank of three cylinders. The GT3 engine could thus also be thought of as similar to a 959 engine, but with water-cooled cylinders. Up to early model year 2004 996 GT3 production, the basic casting used for the crankcase of the GT3 was the same as the air-cooled engine. The "964" casting number was visible on the bottom of the crankcase, and on areas normally machined in air-cooled applications, but not in water-cooled ones. The crankcase casting was changed in mid-2004 to a "996" casting number crankcase to eliminate these external air-cooled remnants, but internally it was the same.

Because the 911 air-cooled crankcase uses the Porsche 356 engine to transmission mounting flange configuration, the 996 GT3 used a 6-speed manual gearbox also of air-cooled 911 heritage. This gearbox has interchangeable gear ratios and is more durable making it more suitable for racing than the standard type 996 gearbox.

To bring the vehicle's track-prowess to the maximum level, Porsche endowed the GT3 with enlarged brakes, a lowered, re-tuned suspension system, lighter-weight wheels and a new front bumper with matched rear spoiler to help increase downforce, thereby increasing grip.

Porsche offered a no-cost option for the GT3 called the 'Clubsport' package. This option replaced the standard electrically adjustable leather front seats with manually adjustable racing bucket seats finished in fire-retardant fabric, single mass flywheel, bolt-in half-roll cage, 6-point drivers racing harness (also replacing the standard side airbags), fire extinguisher (mounted in the front passenger footwell) and preparation for a battery master switch. The Clubsport option was never offered to US customers, ostensibly due to the additional DOT crash testing that would have been required to allow US sales.

996.2 GT3 
Porsche made significant updates to the GT3 for 2004 model year (the first year the car was offered to US customers), using the 2002 996 facelift including headlights that were differentiated from the entry-level Boxster. This model is commonly known as the 996.2 GT3. The braking setup was upgraded, now featuring 6-piston calipers on the front (rears remained 4-piston), and the Porsche Ceramic Composite Brake system was offered as an option. The GT3 now used the body shell of the Carrera 4.

During skidpad testing, the GT3 posted 1.03g.

Porsche's official test-driver Walter Röhrl completed the Nürburgring Nordschleife with the 996 GT3 in 7 minutes 56 seconds, a feat which was used by Porsche to promote the car.

996.2 GT3 RS 
In 2003, Porsche introduced the Porsche 911 GT3 RS, an even more track-focused version of the 996 GT3. RS is short for the German , literally "racing sport" in English. The "RS" moniker, and the characteristic lightweight blue or red wheels and "GT3 RS" side stickers link the 996 GT3 RS to historically important Porsches such as the Carrera 2.7 RS of the early 1970s. The 996 GT3 RS is lighter than the 996 GT3 thanks to a polycarbonate rear window, carbon fibre hood and rear wing.  Porsche Ceramic Composite Brake (PCCB) Carbon fibre-reinforced Silicon Carbide (C/SiC) ceramic composite brakes, which are also more heat and fade resistant than the cast iron units fitted as standard, were optional.

The 996 GT3 RS has a slightly different engine specification to the 996 GT3. The cylinder heads of the 996 GT3 RS have reshaped intake and exhaust ports for race homologation. Porsche claim the same  power output as the standard GT3 but Porsche's control dyno showed a jump to nearly  The RS also has progressive springs rather than linear. The dampers are uprated and are between 10 and 15 percent stiffer than the 996 GT3 in bounce and rebound.

The wheel carriers are totally redesigned to maximize the improved dynamic camber control. The suspension top mounts can be turned 120 degrees to a cup car position. Both front and rear control arms are adjustable. The RS is  lower than the 996 GT3.

This additional power output cannot be homologated since the official engine output figures are certified on a dynamometer.

The 996 GT3 RS had a production run from 2003 to 2005. Only 140 right hand drive cars were built by Porsche and 113 of those were officially imported into the UK. The 996 GT3 RS was not sold in the United States or Canada.

The RS completed a lap of the Nürburgring 7:43, four seconds faster than the 996 GT2, the top-of-the-line 996 variant of the time.

997 GT3

997.1 GT3 
In February 2006, Porsche unveiled the second generation of GT3, the 997 commonly now known as the 997.1 GT3. In addition to a new  3.6 litre flat-six engine, the vehicle featured "zero lift" aerodynamics, meaning the car creates only aerodynamic downforce and no grip-diminishing "lift" upwards and away from the road surface. The GT3 made use of a modified, track oriented version of Porsche's active PASM suspension making it the first of Porsche's RS or GT3 versions to feature an electronically adjustable suspension system. Also available was a navigation system and Porsche's "sports chrono" gauge package. The car went to sale in summer of 2006. A total of 917 units were sold in the United States and 46 units in Canada.

Road and Track was able to achieve a  acceleration time of 3.8 seconds. Porsche's official test-driver Walter Röhrl completed the Nürburgring Nordschleife in 7 minutes 42 seconds with the 997 GT3 in 2006.

997.1 GT3 RS 
Porsche also offered an RS version of the 997 GT3. In common with its predecessors, it was a homologation model for use in a range of racing series. The 997 GT3 RS was introduced in Europe in October 2006 and in North America in spring 2007.

This weight-saving was achieved by the use of an adjustable carbon fibre wing, a steel engine cover, and a lightweight plastic windscreen.

The body of the 997 GT3 RS is  wider at the rear than the 997 GT3 (a legacy from the Carrera 4 models with which it shares its body shell). The muscular-looking rear end conceals a wider track that not only improves directional stability but also increases the potential cornering grip. However, drag is increased and top speed is reduced due to the larger rear wing. In addition to the new technology, the paint scheme and body panels are all designed specifically for the RS.

The US version of the 997 GT3 RS has a standard rear window (not plexiglas) and the smaller 911 fuel tank to comply with rules of SCCA, Can-Am, and IMSA. For Grand-Am races, the central locking wheel nut is replaced with the standard five-lug pattern required under Grand-Am rules.

Production of the first generation 997 GT3 RS (997.1 GT3 RS) ended in 2009. An estimated 1,168 vehicles were delivered worldwide, with a total of 410 units sold in the United States and 42 units in Canada.

997.2 GT3 
It also featured a number of new options including dynamic engine mounts and a pneumatically lifting front axle to compensate for the low ground clearance. The rear spoiler was also modified along with other parts of the bodywork. Deliveries in Europe commenced in November the same year. A total of 654 units were sold in the United States and 58 units in Canada.

997.2 GT3 RS 
The car was not approved for competition in the United States by IMSA American LeMans. Grand-Am originally did not approve the car, but after performance issues (a Porsche team did not compete at the Indy Grand Prix of Alabama round), Grand-Am approved the second-generation car in April 2010.

Porsche test drivers had intended to enter the 2011 12 Hours of Nürburgring on a standard road legal 911 GT3 RS, but had to withdraw due to health reasons from the team that comprised racers Roland Asch and Patrick Simon, plus journalists Horst von Saurma and Chris Harris. The car, entered in cooperation with sport auto (Germany), is registered as S-GO 2400, and was driven from Weissach to Nürburg. The RS was modified according to safety requirements, which included a larger roll cage and fire extinguisher. As no race tyres were available for 19" wheels, the 18" wheels of the Carrera Cup racers were used. Asch qualified with 9:15, 42nd overall, and 9th among the 17 SP7 class entrants, only beaten by its race-prepared Porsche 997 siblings. In an otherwise disappointing race for Porsche, with the best race 997 finishing only 6th, the road-legal car did 145 laps, 9 less than the winning BMW, for place 13. It supposedly had to cover another 306 km, on the Autobahn back home.

A total of 541 units sold in the United States and 71 units in Canada.

997.2 GT3 RS 4.0 
The 911 GT3 RS 4.0, launched in 2011, was the final evolution of the 997 GT3 and featured a 4.0 litre flat-six engine (the largest engine offered in a street-legal 911). The engine itself uses the crankshaft from the RSR with increased stroke dimensions (from 76.4 mm to 80.4 mm). Chassis development was influenced by the GT2 RS and uses parts from other RS 911s. Front dive planes give additional downforce up front. Only 600 cars were built.

The lap time on the Nürburgring Nordschleife is 7 minutes and 27 seconds.

The car was offered in Basalt Black, Carrera White, Paint to Sample Non Metallic and Paint to Sample Metallic colours. A total of 141 units were sold in the United States and 16 units in Canada.

991 GT3

991.1 GT3 
Porsche introduced the 991 GT3 at the Geneva Motor Show in 2013. The 991 GT3 features a new 3.8 litre multi-point electronic indirect injection flat-six engine developing  at 8,250 rpm, a Porsche Doppelkupplung (PDK) double-clutch gearbox and rear-wheel steering. The engine is based on the unit fitted in the 991 Carrera S, but shares only a few common parts. All other components, particularly the crankshaft and valve train, were specially adapted or developed for the 991 GT3. For example, the 991 GT3's engine uses titanium connecting rods attached to forged pistons, in order to allow the engine to reach up to 9,000 rpm. The dual-clutch gearbox is another feature specially developed for the 991 GT3, based on sequential manual transmissions used in racing cars.

The lap time on the Nürburgring Nordschleife is 7 minutes and 25 seconds.

Reliability issues
After a number of engine failures in 2014, it was discovered that the supplier of the connecting rod bolts had made a production error in the alloy of the bolt. Subsequently, all 785 of the GT3s that had been produced up to that point were recalled to the dealership organisations and fitted with new engines, and all owners were issued with an extra year's warranty.

A formal letter sent to Porsche from members of the US-based Rennlist.com "991.1 GT3 Concerned Owners Group" about additional engine durability issues lead to a meeting between representatives of the owners group and Porsche, including head of Porsche Motorsport Dr. Frank-Steffen Walliser, on 3 August 2017 at the Porsche North America Atlanta headquarters. According to Dr. Walliser the concerning high-RPM misfire issue could be traced primarily to a metallurgical defect in certain batches of "finger followers" (valve train rocker arms) and secondarily to individual driving patterns and engine variations – such as temperature, oil quality, oil viscosity and parts tolerances – that lead to increased wear of the specific parts. In response to the issue and after implementing new engine tests to trace down the issue Porsche had developed revised camshafts and finger followers and offers a fully transferable 10-year, 120,000 mile extended engine warranty to all 991.1 generation GT3 owners worldwide that covers the replacement of the defective engine with a new engine with the revised parts if failure is a direct result of the finger-follower issue. The base bumper-to-bumper warranty and all other warranty terms and conditions remain unchanged. Porsche confirmed that the issue is isolated to the 991.1 GT3, and that the 991.1 GT3 RS and the 991 R are not affected.

991.1 GT3 RS 

Porsche launched the RS version of the 911 GT3 at the Geneva Motor Show in 2015. Compared to the 911 GT3, the front fenders are now equipped with louvers above the wheels and the rear fenders now include Turbo-like intakes, rather than an intake below the rear wing. The roof is made from magnesium. The interior includes full bucket seats (based on the carbon seats of the 918 Spyder), carbon-fibre inserts, lightweight door handles and the Club Sport Package as standard (a bolted-on roll cage behind the front seats, preparation for a battery master switch, and a six-point safety harness for the driver and fire extinguisher with mounting bracket).The car was nominated as one of the Britain's best driver's car 2014 by Autocar magazine.

The transmission is PDK only. The 991 GT3 RS also comes with functions such as declutching by "paddle neutral" — comparable to pressing the clutch with a conventional manual gearbox –- and Pit Speed limiter button. As with the 911 GT3, there is rear-axle steering and Porsche Torque Vectoring Plus with fully variable rear axle differential lock. The Nürburgring Nordschleife time is 7 minutes and 20 seconds.

991.2 GT3 
Porsche unveiled the facelifted 991.2 GT3 at the 2017 Geneva Motor Show. Extensive changes were made to the engine allowing for a 9,000 rpm redline from the 4.0 litre flat-six engine derived from Porsche 911 GT3 R and Cup racing cars as well as gasoline direct injection fuel feed system. Porsche's focus was on reducing internal friction to improve throttle response. Compared to the 991.1, the rear spoiler is 0.8 inch taller and located farther back to be more effective resulting in a 20% increase in downforce. There is a new front spoiler and changes to the rear suspension along with larger ram air ducts. The car generates  of downforce at top speed. The 991.2 GT3 brought back the choice between a manual transmission or a PDK dual clutch transmission.

Performance figures include a  acceleration time of 3.8 seconds (3.2 seconds for the PDK version) and a quarter mile time of 11.6 seconds.

GT3 Touring  
Following the roots of the 2016 991.1 911 R, a touring version of the GT3 was introduced that removes the rear wing and replaces it with the modified retractable rear spoiler from the Carrera GTS (with a Gurney flap and 20-degree deployment angle) to give a more smooth and flowing aesthetic image, though it extends further upwards to provide extra downforce. It can also be manually deployed by the press of a button. The downforce is  less than the standard GT3 at top speed. The Touring is only available with a manual transmission, features leather versus Alcantara, and cannot be specified with the Clubsport package available with the normal GT3. Other options and features remain the same as the GT3. The suspension settings are said to be identical to the standard GT3 as is the engine. However, the air intake replaces the normal GT3's box paper air filters with a conic high flow BMC air filters and adds membrane on the two air filter chambers under the gurney flap that are the reasons of the sound differences between the normal GT3 and the GT3 Touring. The touring, unlike the 911 R is not produced in limited numbers, therefore, discouraging high price speculation.

991.2 GT3 RS 
In February 2018, Porsche unveiled a facelifted GT3 RS model to continue their updates for the 991 generation of the 911. A Weissach package including additional carbon fibre body and interior parts as well as magnesium wheels and stiffer suspension settings is available as an option.

On 18 April 2018, driven by Kévin Estre the 991.2 GT3 RS set a lap time of 6:56.4 around the Nürburgring Nordschleife. It is the third Porsche production car to break the 7 minute barrier around the track, the first being the 918 Spyder.

992 GT3

992 GT3 

Porsche revealed the 992 GT3 in February 2021. The 992 GT3 has a redline of 9000 rpm (which is done by the naturally aspirated 4.0-litre flat-six just like the 991 GT3). The 992 GT3 moves to an unequal-length control-arm front suspension influenced by the 991 RSR. The rear wing has swan-neck pylons with increased downforce compared to previous GT3 models. The GT3 is offered with either a seven-speed dual-clutch PDK or a six-speed manual.

992 GT3 Touring 

A Touring package is available, which replaces the rear wing with an automatically deployable rear spoiler.

992 GT3 RS 
The 992 GT3 RS was announced in August 2022. It features a dramatically improved aerodynamic profile compared to the 992 GT3, resulting in 860 kg of downforce at 285kmh, a two-fold increase over the 991.2 GT3 RS, and 409 kg of downforce at 200kmh. The rear wing features a static portion and an active portion, which can open and close automatically based on vehicle data, or manually with a button fitted to the steering wheel (inspired by Formula 1's Drag Reduction Systems (DRS)).

Its engine produces 525 PS at 8500 rpm and 465 Nm of torque at 6300 rpm. The car has a redline of 9000 rpm (same as the GT3 done by its naturally aspirated flat-six engine) The kerb weight of the car in European specification is 1450 kg, and it's capable of achieving 100 km/h in 3.2 seconds, and 200 km/h in 10.6 seconds. The top speed stated by Porsche is 296 km/h.

Specifications (road cars)

Motorsport

Racing cars 
Many different race versions of the 911 GT3 have entered competition since 1998:

996 GT3 Cup (1998–2001) 
Slick tyres supplied by Pirelli measured 245/45-18 front to 305/645-18 rear, brake disks measured 330 mm and ABS was standard. For the 2001 season the GT3 Cup received modified aerodynamics including an enlarged rear wing and improved cooling.

996 GT3 R (1999–2001) 
The 996 GT3 R was introduced in 1999 as a replacement for the 993 RSR. Before its introduction, it was extensively tested at Weissach and Paul Ricard. Reduction in weight over the GT3 road car was achieved by carbon fibre body panels and plexi-glass rear and side windows. The front nose section contained additional air inlets for engine and brake cooling. A steel roll cage was welded into the body and the car was fitted with an air-jack system, fire extinguisher and racing seat with safety harness.

The suspension was similar to the GT3 road car in principle, but with variable springs, adjustable shocks, anti-roll bars and spherical joints. The car could be set up precisely for each track. Large brake discs (standard specifications: 350mm front and 330mm rear) were fitted but with no ABS brakes as they were not permitted in LeMans GT3 class.

The 3.6-litre engine (Type M96/77) developed  at 8,200rpm when fitted with a 43.1 mm air restrictor plate, thereby meeting class regulations. The engine was fitted with a Bosch Motronic 3.1 engine management system. Other engine modifications included titanium conrods and valves, a racing exhaust system, as well as a dry-sump lubrication with an oil-water heat exchanger. A 6-speed sequential manual transmission was installed. Notable wins for the GT3 R include class wins at the 1999 and 2000 24 Hours of LeMans.

996 GT3 RS (2001) 
The 2001 996 GT3 RS won the GTO Class in the 2001 British GT Championship at the hands of Parr Motorsport's Kelvin Burt and Marino Franchitti with 109 points.

996 GT3 Cup (2002–2004) 

In 2002, the GT3 Cup received several changes, adopting facelift 996.2 features such as Turbo-style headlights. The new body significantly improves aerodynamics and cooling. Slicks supplied by Michelin measured 24/64-18 front and 27/68-18 rear. Front brake disks increased to 350 mm in diameter, clamped by six-piston calipers. Weight remained at  dry.

For the 2004 season, the car received further upgrades. Gear ratios of fourth, fifth and sixth gears were shortened. A 89-litre fuel cell improves endurance racing capabilities. Changes were made to the interior to enable the use of the HANS device.

996 GT3 RSR (2004) 
The 2004 Porsche 911 996 GT3 RSR  was essentially an upgraded version of the motorsports oriented GT3 RS. It was the ultimate development of the 996 GT3 featuring a  3.8-litre flat-6 engine and a 6-speed sequential manual transmission. Reduction in weight was achieved by employing carbon fibre panels. Only 37 cars were built. Accolades of the RSR include three victories in American LeMans Series GT2 class.

997 GT3 Cup (2005–2008) 
The 997 features significantly improved aerodynamics and lightweight CFRP parts, including doors, rear body panels, engine deck lid and rear wing. Parts of the suspension are adopted from the GT3 RSR. Brake discs are 380 mm front and 350 mm in the rear in diameter and ABS with four control settings is standard.

997 GT3 RSR  (2006–2012) 
First introduced in 2006, the 997 RSR was built to comply with the Automobile Club de l’Ouest, the FIA-GT and IMSA as well as VLN regulations. Based on the 997 GT3, the RSR features a 3.8-litre flat-6 engine with two 30.3 mm air restrictors as compared to the 3.6-litre engine of its predecessor with 29 mm restrictors. The increase in displacement was achieved through the enlargement of the bore to 102.7 mm with the unchanged stroke of 76.4 mm. The engine has a red-line of 9,000 rpm due to the increase in capacity and the corresponding reprogramming of the electronics. The new positioning of the mid-front radiator and the use of side radiators – shared with the Carrera GT – contribute to the thermal health of the engine. The 997 RSR used the 6-speed sequential manual transmission of 996 RSR for the 2006 season. For the 2007 season, a new 6-speed sequential manual transmission was added which was shared with the RS Spyder.

The bodyshell with the welded-in safety cage is ten percent stiffer than the 996 RSR. The relocation of the supplementary oil tank, power steering components and battery to the front improve weight distribution. The front and rear lids, the front mudguards, the rear section, the doors as well as the front and rear panelling and wing are made of carbon fibre. Polycarbonate rear and side windows further aid in weight reduction.

The newly developed aerodynamic package improves aerodynamic efficiency by a total of around seven percent over the 996 RSR. In compliance with the FIA and A.C.O. regulations the new GT3 RSR features a flat underbody.

The RSR featured ZF-Sachs shock absorbers which have Through-Rod-System with considerably lower chamber pressure and hence generate less friction than conventional dampers. As a result, they offer a significantly improved response characteristic. The improved axles featured new anti-rollbars, an adjustable upper link and an optimised lower link.

In 2007 Porsche added front air louvers that channel air into the radiators and exit through the bonnet.

The 997 GT3 RSR has scored many class victories around the world, including first-place finishes at the 2011 and 2013 Petit Le Mans. The 997 GT3 RSR set a Nürburgring Nordschleife lap time record for non-turbocharged cars at 7:07 while driven by Sabine Schmitz.

997 GT3 Cup S (2008–2010) 
Homologated on basis of the GT3 RS road car instead of the GT3 and destined for international FIA GT3 customer racing. Suspension components have been adopted from the GT3 RSR.

997 GT3 Cup 3.8 (2009–2013) 

Deliveries began in the same year. The base MSRP of the European model was €149,850 (before tax).

997 GT3 R (2010–2013) 
Replacing the GT3 Cup S and built from the ground up for FIA GT3 regulations the GT3 R features a 4.0 litre,  boxer engine, a six-speed sequential transmission, a throttle-blip function, ABS and traction control. Base MSRP was 279,000 Euro (excl. taxes).

For 2013 Porsche significantly modified the vehicle, changed the aerodynamics and increased the track, wheelbase and tyre width by several centimetres. An Evo conversion kit was offered to customers for 45,500 Euro (excl. taxes).

997 GT3 R Hybrid (2010–2011) 
The 997 GT3 R Hybrid made its debut at the 2010 Geneva Motor Show. The hybrid technology featured in the car was developed by the Williams F1 Team and is based on their F1 kinetic energy recovery system (KERS) which they did not race in 2009. Unlike other KERS that were developed for F1, the Williams system is based on using kinetic energy stored in a flywheel rather than batteries. The GT3-R has two electric motors, both developing a total output of at least , driving the front wheels to supplement the  4.0-litre flat-six engine at the rear. The car was entered at the 2010 24 Hours Nürburgring. As part of the buildup to the 24 hour race the GT3 Hybrid made its racing debut at the VLN 4 hour endurance 57th ADAC Westfalenfahrt at Nürburgring on 27 March 2010. On 28 May 2011, it won its first VLN race. At the 2011 24 Hours of Nurburgring, weight/restrictor penalties as well as technical difficulties prevented the R Hybrid from climbing higher than 28th place. The car also ran as an unclassified car at the 2011 American Le Mans Series at Monterey event; despite starting from last place, it finished ahead of all the other GT cars and also performed the fastest GT lap of the race.

991 GT3 Cup (2013–2017) 
Porsche introduced the 991 GT3 Cup for the 2013 Porsche Supercup season, based on the 991 GT3. Like the 991 GT3 road car, its improvements over the 997 model include revised aerodynamics, an improved rollcage, new wheels and a revised chassis. The transmission includes a paddle-shift, race-bred, pneumatically activated six speed developed specifically for the track. It uses lightweight materials in its construction, and a stripped-out cabin complete with a full roll cage, racing seat and all the safety gear required for competition, weighing .

991 RSR (2013–2017) 
In 2013, Porsche introduced the newest version of the RSR based on the 991 model for the LM GTE category. Because the 991 GT3 was not in production at the time of the announcement, Porsche was forced to homologate it based on the 911 Carrera model. The 991 RSR includes revised aerodynamics, a lighter gearbox and a new, lower suspension. For the 2013 season, Porsche retained the Mezger engine of the 997 GT3 RSR model. Manthey Racing was chosen to run the cars in the FIA World Endurance Championship; the team achieved its best success at the 2013 24 Hours of Le Mans where the 991 RSR finished 1–2 in the GT class.

For 2014, Porsche announced that it partnered with CORE Autosport to run two Porsche 911 RSRs in the United SportsCar Championship (under the Porsche North America team name) while AKB GT Raceline has announced that they would run a pair of 911 RSRs in the series. Team Falken Tire also announced that it would be running a 911 RSR from Sebring onwards. Manthey Racing will continue to run two 911 RSRs in the WEC.

991 GT America (2014) 
Porsche also announced a variant of the 991 GT3 Cup car for the United SportsCar Championship known as the 911 GT America. The car is homologated exclusively for the Grand-Touring Daytona category of the series. Upgrades over the regular Cup car include improved aerodynamics, a bigger 4.0L flat-six engine, a new gearbox, a different safety cell, new brakes and reliability upgrades for endurance racing.

991 GT3 R (2016–2019) 
In May 2015, Porsche announced the 991 GT3 R, a customer race car designed to compete in Group GT3 from 2016 onwards. The GT3 R features a double-bubble roof, and a wheelbase which had been lengthened by 8.3 cm. Engineers also "significantly optimised" the centre of gravity position versus the old R, using carbon-fibre composite material (CFRP) for the roof, front cover and fairing, wheel arches, doors, side and tail sections as well as the rear cover. All windows – and for the first time ever, the windscreen – are made from polycarbonate to cut weight. Race car essentials such as an integrated (welded) roll cage according to FIA Appendix J, safety fuel cell (approximately 120 litres, with fuel cut off safety valve in accordance with FIA regulations), removable roof escape hatch and an air jack system are present.

The GT3 R has adopted the concept of the central radiator from the 911 RSR. By eliminating the side radiators, the position of the centre of gravity is improved, the radiator is better protected against collision damage, and the venting of hot air through louvres in the front cover is enhanced. The two-metre wide rear wing lends aerodynamic balance and distinctive wheel arch air vents on the front fairings increase downforce at the front axle. The GT3 R's front MacPherson strut suspension and multi-link rear suspension are adjustable in height, camber and toe, and there are adjustable anti-roll bar blades at both ends. All wheel hubs come with centre-lock wheel nuts. There are two separate brake circuits for the front and rear axles; driver adjustable via a brake balance bar system. The front brakes consist of six-piston aluminium monobloc calipers gripping 380 mm discs; the rears are four-piston items with 372 mm discs.

991 RSR (2017–2019) 

In November 2016, Porsche introduced the new version of the 911 RSR prepared for the LM GTE category. The car has a rear mid-engined design, powered by a 4.0-litre flat-six boxer engine, rated at  depending on series air restrictor. Other new features include a new transmission, a new direct fuel injection, a new aerodynamic pack including a swan-neck wing and a larger rear diffuser, quick-change body panels and double-wishbone suspension with quick-change shim-system all around, Bertrandt-developed LED lights first developed for the 919 Hybrid and new cockpit with fixed seat, movable pedal box, multi-function steering wheel with integrated display, a rear-view camera and collision avoidance system. The new RSR made its competition debut at the 2017 24 Hours of Daytona.

At the 2018 24 Hours of Le Mans the Manthey Racing-entered Porsche GT Team 911 RSR #92 and #91 finished 1–2 in the LM GTE Pro class respectively. Both #92 and #91 carried a special liveries marking the 70th anniversary of the marque with the liveries being the liveries from the past racing cars built by Porsche. The #92 carries the "Pink Pig" livery, homage to the 917/20 which used the same livery, and the #91 carries the iconic Rothmans-inspired livery from the 80s 956 and the 962. Dempsey-Proton Racing-entered 911 RSR #77 won LM GTE Am.

At the 2019 24 Hours of Le Mans the Manthey Racing-entered Porsche GT Team 911 RSR #91 finished second in the LM GTE Pro class and CORE-entered Porsche GT Team 911 RSR #93 finished third. Team Project 1-entered 911 RSR #56 won LM GTE Am.

991 GT3 Cup (2017–2020) 
Unveiled at the 2016 Paris Motor Show, the 2017 911 GT3 Cup is based on the 991.2 911 GT3. The GT3 Cup is priced at 189,900 Euro excluding taxes.

991 GT3 R (2019–) 
In May 2018 Porsche introduced a new iteration of the 911 GT3 R based on the 991.2 GT3 RS, available for customer teams for the 2019 season. Its 4.0-litre flat-six boxer engine, largely identical to the unit used in the GT3 and GT3 RS street cars and GT3 Cup and RSR race cars, develops approx. . Improvements include a larger diffuser for more efficient aero, double wishbone front suspension adopted from the RSR, a shim system allowing setup changes without new alignment, larger front tyres, an electro-hydraulically actuated clutch allowing the removal of the clutch pedal, a fuel cell that can be configured to be refilled from left or right of the vehicle depending on circuit layout, a rear-view camera and collision avoidance system, a fixed seat with movable pedal-box and energy-absorbing impact elements placed in the doors for improved safety as well as air conditioning. The GT3 R is priced at 459,000 Euro excluding taxes.

991 RSR (2019–2023) 

In July 2019, Porsche introduced the new version of the 911 RSR prepared for the LM GTE category at the Goodwood Festival of Speed. It is an evolution of the 991 RSR (2017), and 95% of the car is new. The engine has larger displacement, . A more rigid sequential manual constant-mesh gearbox allows for faster shifts. The two exhaust pipes now exit on each side in front of the rear wheels, making space for an optimised diffuser. Aerodynamic efficiency is claimed to have been improved significantly. The car retains safety features such as a removable roof hatch and a rigidly-mounted seat with movable pedal-box from the predecessor model along with additional impact protection elements.

992 GT3 Cup (2021–) 
The body is made up of 70% aluminium and 30% steel allowing to keep the weight down to around 1,260 kg. Inside the car, there are new racing seats, a new carbon steering wheel and a new 10.3in screen for data and diagnostics. The 911 GT3 Cup is priced at 225,000 Euro (US$267,165) excluding taxes.

992 GT3 R (2023–)

Racing history 
Apart from numerous class wins, the 911 GT3 won major events overall:
 24 Hours Nürburgring in 2000, 2006, 2007, 2008, 2009, 2011, 2018, 2021 by Manthey Racing team
 Various VLN races at the Nürburgring.
 Spa 24 Hours in 2003, 2010, 2019, 2020
 24 Hours of Daytona in 2003
 Petit Le Mans in 2015
 Bathurst 12 Hour in 2019
 Dubai 24 Hour in 2021

Porsche Cup 
Various national and regional Porsche Carrera Cup and Porsche GT3 Cup Challenge as well as the international Porsche Supercup one-make series – which serves as Formula One support series – utilise the 911 GT3 since 1998.

1999 
Due to the absence of the official Porsche team in the 1999 24 Hours of Le Mans, only privateers with the nearly obsolete air-cooled 993 GT2 Turbo were expected to represent the marque, with few chances to beat the Chrysler Viper for GTS class honors. Two new race versions of the water-cooled 996 GT3-R were entered in the GT class by private teams. The car entered by the German Manthey Racing team finished 13th overall.

2000s 
The 996 GT3-R were made available to privateer teams. In the 24 Hours Nürburgring of the year 2000, a factory-backed effort of the local Phoenix team managed to beat the Zakspeed Chrysler Viper that dominated this race from 1998 to 2000. The improved 996 GT3-RS version of 2001 was entered in countless races in the years to follow, scoring not only many class wins, but also overall wins at Daytona and Spa in 2003. In 2004, the 996 GT3-RSR was made available, with numerous improvements to the RS, including a sequential gearbox, which allows for faster gearshifts.

VLN 
In 2005, the new 997-generation racing vehicles began to debut with the GT3 Cup, followed by the launch of the 911 GT3-RSR at the 2006 Spa 24 Hours. In VLN endurance races, the Manthey entry won the last 4h race before the 24h event, and then the big event also. Their Porsche 997 GT3 RSR has a larger front splitter, taller rear wing and a  4.0L Flat-6 engine.

24 Hours of Le Mans 
After winning the 1998 24 Hours of Le Mans outright, Porsche dominated the GT/N-GT class at Le Mans. There were no major competitors and Porsche took seven consecutive class wins from 1999 to 2005. In 2006 the Porsches led for much of the race but one by one the competitors had problems and withdrew. Last minute mechanical issues threw the Seikel car back behind the surprising winner, the Panoz Esperante GTLMM.

2007 saw the debut of the 997 GT3 RSR. IMSA Matmut took pole by more than a second over the Ferrari (but lost it after breaching Parc Fermé rules). The new Porsche was now fitted with wider rear tyres and smaller restrictors than the rules allow. This was compensated by the car weighing 100 kg more. This was an advantage at Le Mans over the lighter and nimbler F430.

Le Mans Series 
Felbermayr-Proton and IMSA Performance Matmut received the new 997 just before the 2007 season. Marc Lieb and Richard Lietz share the better of the two Felbermayr cars. Patrick Pilet and Raymond Narac share the IMSA car. Felbermayr-Proton won the championship in 2009 and 2010. In 2011, Nicholas Armindo won the GTE-Am class.

See also 
 9ff GT9, a high-speed automobile, based on the 997 GT3
 Ruf RGT, a sports car similar to the GT3 built by Ruf Automobile
List of best-selling automobiles

References

External links 

911 GT3
Sports cars
Coupés
Grand tourer racing cars
Rear-wheel-drive vehicles
Cars introduced in 1999
2000s cars
2010s cars
2020s cars
911 GT3
Rear-engined vehicles
Cars powered by boxer engines